Terrace Sykes (born April 5, 1956) is an American former professional basketball player. A native of Colfax, Louisiana, he attended Dry Prong High School in nearby Dry Prong, where he took his team to a 2A State Basketball championship during his senior season. Sykes played collegiately for the Grambling State Tigers, where he led the Southwestern Athletic Conference (SWAC) in rebounding twice and was a three-time All-SWAC selection.

Sykes was selected by the Washington Bullets as the 37th overall pick in the 1978 NBA draft but he never played in the National Basketball Association (NBA). Instead, Sykes played primarily in Europe. He played in the Philippine Basketball Association (PBA) with the San Miguel Beermen during the 1982 season.

Sykes was inducted into the Grambling Legends Hall of Fame in 2019. His granddaughter, Mya Hollingshed, plays basketball collegiately for the Colorado Buffaloes.

Career statistics

College

|-
| style="text-align:left;"| 1977–78
| style="text-align:left;"| Grambling State
| 23 || – || – || .526 || – || .706 || 11.0 || – || – || – || 23.8
|- class="sortbottom"
| style="text-align:center;" colspan="2"| Career
| 23 || – || – || .526 || – || .706 || 11.0 || – || – || – || 23.8

References

External links
College statistics
Italian league stats

1956 births
Living people
African-American basketball players
American expatriate basketball people in Italy
American expatriate basketball people in the Philippines
American men's basketball players
Basketball players from Louisiana
Grambling State Tigers men's basketball players
People from Colfax, Louisiana
Power forwards (basketball)
San Miguel Beermen players
Washington Bullets draft picks
Philippine Basketball Association imports
21st-century African-American people
20th-century African-American sportspeople